George's Brook is a designated place in the Canadian province of Newfoundland and Labrador that is a neighbourhood in the Town of George's Brook-Milton. It is north of Clarenville.

History 
A post office opened in George's Brook in 1950 with its first postmistress being Mona Pelley. By 1956 it had a population of 197. In October 1985, the community got it first waymaster, Charles Pelley.

In 2017, residents of George's Brook and the neighbouring community of Milton voted in favour of joining together to incorporate as a town. The Town of George's Brook-Milton was officially incorporated by the provincial government on May 8, 2018.

Geography 
George's Brook is in Newfoundland within Subdivision K of Division No. 7.

Demographics 

See also 
List of communities in Newfoundland and Labrador
List of designated places in Newfoundland and Labrador

References 

Populated coastal places in Canada
Designated places in Newfoundland and Labrador